Ringgold is an unincorporated community in Pittsylvania County in the U.S. state of Virginia with a postal zip code 24586.

The community was named after Maj. Samuel Ringgold, a hero of the Battle of Palo Alto in the U.S.-Mexican War.

Ringgold lies twenty minutes' drive away from Danville, Virginia. Southern Ringgold touches the southern border of Virginia and North Carolina.

Notable residents
Trey Edmunds, running back for the Pittsburgh Steelers
Tremaine Edmunds, linebacker for the Buffalo Bills
Terrell Edmunds, safety for the Pittsburgh Steelers

References

Unincorporated communities in Pittsylvania County, Virginia
Unincorporated communities in Virginia
Danville, Virginia micropolitan area